The Cape Town ePrix was a  Formula E event held in Cape Town, South Africa. It was the  first edition that took place on February 25, 2023. It was the first Formula E race held in Sub-Saharan Africa.

History 
Initially planned to be held in 2022, the race was canceled for unknown reasons likely related to the COVID-19 pandemic. Though not initially featured on the 2023 calendar, it was introduced after the cancellation of the Seoul ePrix.

Track 

The track is believed to be "one of the fastest on the calendar". In total, the track has 12 turns.

References

External links 
Official website

Cape Town ePrix
Cape Town
Cape Town
Cape Town